Mike He (also spelled Mike Ho; ; born 28 December 1983) is a Taiwanese actor who started his career as a model before switching to acting. He has been managed by HIM International Music since 2010.

Career
He appeared in a few music videos before debuting in his first Taiwanese television series, Seventh Grade, in 2004 as one of the main characters alongside Ariel Lin. He later starred in another series with her as a lead in Love Contract.

In 2005, he starred in two TV series, Express Boy with Hsu Wei-lun, and Devil Beside You, opposite Rainie Yang and Kingone Wang. In 2006, he starred in TVBS-G's series Marry Me!.

In October 2006, he signed up for another TV series, Why Why Love, also with Rainie Yang and Kingone Wang.

He also acted in the Taiwanese TV series Bull Fighting, alongside the Taiwanese singer and S.H.E member Hebe Tien.

In 2008, He appeared in the Chinese television series Infernal Lover (无间有爱）.

In 2009, He co-starred in a Taiwanese TV series Calling For Love with Charlene Choi. It was directed by Lin He Long who has already worked with He in Devil Beside You, Why Why Love and Infernal Lover.

2011 was a comeback year for He after a relatively low profile 2010. His two television series Sunny Happiness and Love Keeps Going, which co-stars Taiwanese actresses, Janine Chang and Cyndi Wang respectively, received high ratings and positive reviews.

In the same year, He also released his second book Le Retour Du Sud De La France (南法寄出) on 21 September 2011. Since its release, it has received relatively positive responses from both the media and fans. 50,000 books were sold by early October.

In 2012, He filmed two films, The Golden Couple (金童玉女) and Bad Girls (女孩坏坏). In December 2011, He also went to ShenZhen, China, to film a Mainland TV series, Refueling Mother/Happy Mother (加油妈妈/幸福妈妈). It aired every night from 14 October – 14 November 2012 and was a Hunan Satellite TV hit.

From August 2012 to January 2013, He filmed Taiwanese TV series Spring Love co-starring Da Yuan, Nylon Chen, and Mai Sato. It started airing 27 January 2013 on FTV / 2 February 2013 on GTV.

Filmography

Television series

Film

Variety show host
 2003–2004: TVBS-G E-News (娛樂新聞)

Music video appearances
 Valen Hsu 許茹芸 – 雲且留住
 Angelica Lee 李心潔 – Loved Wrongly (愛錯)
 Elva Hsiao 蕭亞軒 – Love's Password
 Landy Wen 溫嵐 – Wish Me Happy Birthday (祝我生日快樂)
 Fish Leong – 梁静茹 中间 (Love Contract) 2004
 Ariel Lin – 林依晨 Lonely Northern Hemisphere (Love Contract) 2004
 Anson Hu – 胡彥斌 Waiting for you (Love Contract) 2004
 Tanya Chua – 蔡健雅 Amphibia
 Rainie Yang 楊丞琳 – Ideal Lover (理想情人) (Devil Beside You)
 Rainie Yang – Just Wanna Love You/Zhi Xiang Ai Ni (只想愛你)
 Rainie Yang – Ai Mei (曖昧) (Devil Beside You)
 Olivia Ong – Till the World Ends (海枯石爛)
 Rainie Yang – The Audience (觀眾)

Discography
1.〈天使的翅膀〉In Memory of Beatrice Hsu Wei Lun (lit. Angel's Wings) 
 this specially composed piece was sung by Beatrice Hsu Wei Lun's younger brother, Mike He, Ariel Lin, Joe Cheng, Cyndi Wang, etc. 
2.〈發現我愛你〉呼叫大明星插曲 (lit. Realizing [that] I Love You) 
 Ending Theme Song of the drama 'Calling For Love' 
3.〈心中的花園〉美樂。加油插曲 (lit. A Heart's Garden) 
 Ending Theme Song of the drama 'Love Keeps Going' a.k.a. 'Mei Le, Go!'

Published works
 3 June 2008 – Devil Prince Mike He : Xiao Mei's 12 Japanese Lessons
 3 October 2008 – Devil Prince Mike He : Xiao Mei's 12 Japanese Lessons (Deluxe Edition)
 19 September 2011 – Le Retour Du Sud De La France (Taiwan Traditional version)
 23 December 2011 – Le Retour Du Sud De La France (Mainland Simplified version)

References

External links
 Mike He's blog
 Mike He's WeiBo 微博
 Mike He's H.I.M Official Forum

1983 births
Living people
Male actors from Taipei
Taiwanese male film actors
Taiwanese male television actors
21st-century Taiwanese male actors
Taiwanese idols
Participants in Chinese reality television series